Patrick Bordon (born 6 April 1988) is a Slovenian professional footballer who plays as a forward.

Club career

Partizani Tirana
On 30 August 2013, Bordon joined the newly promoted Albanian Superliga side Partizani Tirana on a one-year deal, taking the vacant squad number 9. After some matches in bench, he made his competitive debut on 2 October 2013 in the matchday 6 against Kukësi, replacing Aldo Mitraj for the final 13 minutes as Partizani won 1–0. On 6 November 2013, Bordon made his Albanian Cup debut by playing in the second leg of first round against Ada Velipojë, scoring a brace in an eventual 3–1 home win, 4–2 on aggregate, which ensured Partizani progression to the next round. He later terminated his contract with the club during the winter transfer window.

References

External links
 
 
 PrvaLiga profile 

1988 births
Living people
Sportspeople from Koper
Slovenian footballers
Association football forwards
Slovenia youth international footballers
FC Koper players
NK Drava Ptuj players
NK Bela Krajina players
FK Partizani Tirana players
KF Bylis Ballsh players
NK Ankaran players
NK Jedinstvo Bihać players
FK Panevėžys players
Persik Kediri players
S.P. Tre Fiori players
Akhaa Ahli Aley FC players
Slovenian PrvaLiga players
Slovenian Second League players
Kategoria Superiore players
Cypriot Second Division players
A Lyga players
Lebanese Premier League players
Slovenian expatriate footballers
Slovenian expatriate sportspeople in Italy
Expatriate footballers in Italy
Slovenian expatriate sportspeople in Norway
Expatriate footballers in Norway
Slovenian expatriate sportspeople in Albania
Expatriate footballers in Albania
Expatriate footballers in Bosnia and Herzegovina
Slovenian expatriate sportspeople in Cyprus
Expatriate footballers in Cyprus
Slovenian expatriate sportspeople in Lithuania
Expatriate footballers in Lithuania
Slovenian expatriate sportspeople in Indonesia
Expatriate footballers in Indonesia
Expatriate footballers in San Marino
Slovenian expatriate sportspeople in Lebanon
Expatriate footballers in Lebanon
ENAD Polis Chrysochous players